The 7.5 FK Brno Field Pistol is a semi-automatic pistol developed by the Czech company FK Brno with support from Fratelli Tanfoglio S.N.C. It is a modified CZ-75 design.

History
According to the manufacturer, development started in 2011. Main development objectives included:

 Muzzle velocities high enough to consistently hit a 100×100 mm (3.93-sq.in.) target at 100 meters.
 Barrel length of 6 inches (152 mm) to achieve the required muzzle velocities.
 Felt recoil impulse should not exceed that of a hot .45 ACP +P load shot from an all-steel gun.
 Bullet's terminal performance at 100 m must be enough to effectively kill a 330-lb. living target.
 Target's permanent wound cavity should measure a minimum of 35 mm in diameter (1.38 in) and 300 mm in length (11.8 in)
Due to these specifications, FK BRNO had to design the 7.5 FK round from scratch. FK Brno first showcased the Field Pistol at the  IWA 2015 expo.

Design details
The 7.5 FK Field Pistol is a single action, tilting barrel semi-automatic pistol with a proprietary recoil attenuation system.  It features a unique "butterfly" rear sight, designed to give the shooter a better view of the target and to naturally align with the front sight. The sight is adjustable for windage.

The 7.5 FK Field Pistol is significantly larger and heavier than other all-steel military pistols and about twice as heavy as current standard issue military pistols.

The proprietary cartridge is claimed to have an effective range - in terms of accuracy and terminal ballistics - of at least 100 meters (109 yards) for targets of up to 150 kg (330 lbs) while maintaining relatively low recoil and good controllability. To corroborate this claim, the manufacturer shot fenced domesticated hogs.

The cartridge produces 842 ft⋅lbf of muzzle energy (1142 J), roughly on par with 10mm Auto and .357 Magnum.

FK PSD Multi-Cal 

The FK PSD is the FK BRNO design adapted to have a polymer frame. Available at a much lower price-point, the PSD is lighter and roughly equal to the FK BRNO in performance. A multi-caliber design, it also shoots the cheaper 9x19mm, 10 mm Auto and .40 S&W ammunition types with a barrel replacement.

References

2011 establishments in the Czech Republic
2011 establishments in the United States
Short recoil firearms